Erginus rubellus is a species of sea snail, a true limpet, a marine gastropod mollusk in the family Erginidae, one of the families of true limpets.

Description

Distribution
 West Greenland and East Greenland
 Canada: Queen Elizabeth Islands, Baffin Island, Labrador, Newfoundland, Nova Scotia
 Iceland

Ecology 
Habitat of Erginus rubellus include infralittoral and circalittoral of the Gulf and estuary.

References
This article incorporates CC-BY-3.0 text from the reference.

 Brunel, P.; Bosse, L.; Lamarche, G. (1998). Catalogue of the marine invertebrates of the estuary and Gulf of St. Lawrence. Canadian Special Publication of Fisheries and Aquatic Sciences, 126. 405 p.
 Turgeon, D., Quinn, J. F., Bogan, A. E., Coan, E. V., Hochberg, F. G., Lyons, W. G., Mikkelsen, P. M., Neves, R. J., Roper, C. F. E., Rosenberg, G., Roth, B., Scheltema, A., Thompson, F. G., Vecchione, M., Williams, J. D. (1998). Common and scientific names of aquatic invertebrates from the United States and Canada: mollusks. 2nd ed. American Fisheries Society Special Publication, 26. American Fisheries Society: Bethesda, MD (USA). ISBN 1-888569-01-8. IX, 526 + cd-rom pp.

External links
 Fabricius, O. (1780). Fauna Groenlandica, systematice sistens animalia groenlandiae occidentalis hactenus indagata, quoad nomen specificium, triviale, vernaculumque, synonyma auctorum plurimum, descriptionem, locum, victum, generationem, mores, usum capturamque singuli, pro ut detegendi occasio fuit, maximaque parte secundum proprias observationes. Hafniae
 Gofas, S.; Le Renard, J.; Bouchet, P. (2001). Mollusca. in: Costello, M.J. et al. (eds), European Register of Marine Species: a check-list of the marine species in Europe and a bibliography of guides to their identification. Patrimoines Naturels. 50: 180-213

Erginidae
Gastropods described in 1780